Elafin, also known as peptidase inhibitor 3 or skin-derived antileukoprotease (SKALP), is a protein that in humans is encoded by the PI3 gene.

Function 

This gene encodes an elastase-specific protease inhibitor, which contains a WAP-type four-disulfide core (WFDC) domain, and is thus a member of the WFDC domain family. Most WFDC gene members are localized to chromosome 20q12-q13 in two clusters: centromeric and telomeric. This gene belongs to the centromeric cluster.

Clinical significance 

Elafin has been found to have utility in serving as a biomarker for graft versus host disease of the skin.

Elafin plays some role in gut inflammation.

References

Further reading

External links